The Ventura Unified School District (VUSD) is a school district headquartered in Ventura, California, United States. The district serves  students in Ventura and surrounding unincorporated communities of Ventura County including Saticoy, Casitas Springs, Oak View, and La Conchita. As of the 2019–20 school year, VUSD enrollment numbered 16,353 students.

History
In November 2020, the Ventura Unified School District Board of Trustees voted to change the name of Blanche Reynolds Elementary School to Lemon Grove School effective with the 2020–21 school year. Members of the community demanded the school's name be dropped because Reynolds, a school superintendent in early 20th-century Ventura County, supported racial segregation in education. Accompanying this change will be the addition of middle school grades to the campus, becoming a TK—8 school.

Schools

Elementary schools

 ATLAS Elementary TK-8 (Academy of Technology and Leadership at Saticoy; formerly Saticoy Elementary School)
 Blanche Reynolds Elementary School (will become Lemon Grove School, TK—8)
 Citrus Glen Elementary School
 E.P. Foster Elementary School
 Elmhurst Elementary School
 Homestead Elementary School
 Juanamaria Elementary School
 Junipero Serra Elementary School
 Lincoln Elementary School
 Loma Vista Elementary School
 Montalvo Elementary School
 Mound Elementary School
 Pierpont Elementary School
 Poinsettia Elementary School
 Portola Elementary School
 Sheridan Way Elementary School
 Sunset Elementary School and Middle School
 Will Rogers Elementary School

Middle schools
 Anacapa Middle School
 Balboa Middle School
 Cabrillo Middle school
 De Anza Academy of Technology and Arts (DATA)

K—8 schools
 Open Classroom
 Sunset Elementary and Middle School
 Atlas TK—8

High schools
 Buena High School
 Community Day School
 Foothill Technology High School
 El Camino High School at Ventura College
 Pacific High School
 Ventura High School

Adult school
 Ventura Adult and Continuing Education (VACE)

Transportation

Ventura Unified has a bus fleet of the following:
Gen 3 Thomas Saf-T-Liner ER (John Deere CNG) (Bus 79)
Gen 2 Thomas Saf-T-Liner HDX (John Deere CNG) (Bus 80-83)
Gen 3 Thomas Saf-T-Liner HDX Diesel (Cummins L9) (Bus 21-26)
Current-gen IC Bus RE300 with MaxxForce DT Diesel 
Current-gen IC Bus CE300 with MaxxForce DT Diesel 
Thomas Saf-T-Liner C2

Historical fleet
Crown Supercoach
Crown Supercoach Series II

References

External links

 

Ventura, California
School districts in Ventura County, California